The Symphony No. 4 in F minor by Ralph Vaughan Williams was dedicated by the composer to Arnold Bax.

Unlike Vaughan Williams's first three symphonies, it was not given a title, the composer stating that it was to be understood as pure music, without any incidental or external inspiration.

In contrast to many of Vaughan Williams's previous compositions, the symphony displays a severity of tone. The composer himself once observed of it, "I'm not at all sure that I like it myself now. All I know is that it's what I wanted to do at the time." According to the letter written by Arthur Benjamin to Vaughan Williams on 21 April 1935 (BL MS Mus 1714/1/9, ff. 113–14), the British composer Sir William Walton admired the work greatly. Benjamin wrote: "I met Willy Walton on the way to the Hall and he said — having been to the rehearsals — that we were going to hear the greatest symphony since Beethoven. Arnold, too, agreed. An alternative source states that Walton heard Constant Lambert saying it to Benjamin.

Only two symphonies of Vaughan Williams end loudly: No. 4 and No. 8.

The work was first performed on 10 April 1935 by the BBC Symphony Orchestra conducted by Adrian Boult. Its first recording, made two years later, featured the composer himself conducting the same orchestra in what proved to be his only commercial recording of any of his symphonies. It was released on 78-rpm discs in the UK by HMV and in the US by RCA Victor, and has been reissued on LP and CD.

The United States premiere was given on 19 December 1935 by Artur Rodziński and the Cleveland Orchestra. The earliest American performance to have survived in recorded form was the broadcast of 21 May 1938 by Adrian Boult, guest conducting the NBC Symphony Orchestra, released by Pristine Classical. This was followed in 14 March 1943 by another performance by the NBC Symphony Orchestra under Leopold Stokowski. It was the only time he ever conducted the work and his performance has been issued on CD by Cala Records.

Structure

The work is in four movements with the third and fourth linked:

Allegro
Andante moderato
Scherzo: Allegro molto
Finale con epilogo fugato: Allegro molto

A typical performance takes about 32 minutes.

Opening dissonance of the first movement:

Germinal motive that develops out of the opening dissonance:

Motive built of fourths (measure 14–15):

Instrumentation
The symphony is scored for a large orchestra including: 2 or 3 flutes (2nd doubling on piccolo), 2 or 3 oboes (2nd doubling on cor anglais), 2 clarinets (in B), bass clarinet (in B) (ad lib.), 2 bassoons, contrabassoon (ad lib.), 4 horns (in F), 2 trumpets (in C), 3 trombones, tuba, timpani, triangle, side drum, cymbals, bass drum, strings.

Peggy Glanville-Hicks’ claim
His student, the Australian composer Peggy Glanville-Hicks, claimed that he had borrowed the opening theme of the first movement from her Sinfonietta for Small Orchestra in D minor (1935), and that she in turn borrowed it back for her opera The Transposed Heads (1953). Glanville-Hicks did not complete her Sinfonietta until three months after the premiere of Vaughan Williams's symphony, but she was writing it at the same time as the composition of the symphony.

Recordings
Vaughan Williams—BBC Symphony Orchestra. HMV Red Seal 78s DB 3367–3370 (Abbey Road, 11 October 1937)
Boult—NBC Symphony Orchestra. (plus music by Beethoven, Busoni, Butterworth, Copland, Elgar, Holst, and Walton). Pristine Classical PASC 626 (Studio 8-H, 21 May 1938)
Stokowski—NBC Symphony Orchestra. (+ music by Butterworth + Antheil). Cala Records CACD 0528 (14 March 1943)
Barbirolli—BBC Symphony Orchestra (+ music by Benjamin-A).  Barbirolli Society SJB 1064 (1950)
Mitropoulos—Philharmonic-Symphony Orchestra of New York (+ music by several others).  Music & Arts CD 1214 (Carnegie Hall, 5 April 1953)
Boult—London Philharmonic Orchestra. Decca LXT 2909 (Kingsway Hall, 2–4 December 1953)
Mitropoulos—Philharmonic-Symphony Orchestra of New York. Columbia Masterworks ML 5158 (Columbia 30th Street Studios, 9 January 1956)
Sargent—BBC Symphony Orchestra (+ Stokowski's recording of Symphony No. 8). Carlton BBC Radio Classics 15656 91312 (Royal Albert Hall, 16 August 1963)
Bernstein—New York Philharmonic (+ Serenade to Music). Columbia MS 7177 (Philharmonic Hall, 21 October 1965)
Boult—New Philharmonia (+ Norfolk Rhapsody No. 1 in E minor). HMV ASD 2375 (Abbey Road, 22–23 Jan. and 12 February 1968)
Previn—London Symphony Orchestra (+ Concerto accademico). RCA Red Seal SB 6801 (Kingsway Hall, 10–11 March 1969)
Del Mar—BBC Scottish Symphony Orchestra (+ music by Elgar + Bliss). BBC Music Magazine MM 80 (BBC Studios, Glasgow, 24 August 1973)
Davis-C—Boston Symphony Orchestra (+ music by many others). BSO CB 100 (Symphony Hall, 26 October 1973)
Berglund—Royal Philharmonic Orchestra (+ The Lark Ascending). EMI ASD 3904 (Abbey Road, 29–30 October 1979)
Thomson—London Symphony Orchestra (+ Concerto accademico). Chandos CHAN 8633 (St Jude-on-the-Hill, Hampstead, 27–28 November 1987)
Rozhdestvensky— USSR State Symphony Orchestra (+ A Pastoral Symphony). Melodiya CD 10-02170-3 (Philharmonia Building, Leningrad, 28 October 1988)
Handley—Royal Liverpool Philharmonic Orchestra (+ A Pastoral Symphony). EMI Eminence CD EMX 2192 (Philharmonic Hall, Liverpool, 8–9 March 1991)
Slatkin—Philharmonia (+ A Pastoral Symphony + Fantasia on "Greensleeves"). RCA Victor Red Seal 09026-61194-2 (Watford Town Hall, 29 November 1991)
Davis-A—BBC Symphony Orchestra (+ Symphony No. 5). Teldec 4509-90844-2 (St Augustine's Church, London, December 1992)
Haitink—London Philharmonic Orchestra (+ A Pastoral Symphony). EMI CD 5 56564 2 (Colosseum, Watford, December 1996)
Norrington—London Philharmonic Orchestra (+ Symphony No. 6). Decca 458 658–2 (Colosseum, Watford, February 1997)
Hickox—London Symphony Orchestra (+ Mass in G minor + Six Choral Songs). Chandos CHAN 9984 (All Saints Church, Tooting, January 2001)
Daniel—Bournemouth Symphony Orchestra (+ Norfolk Rhapsody 1 in E minor + Suite "Flos campi"). Naxos 8.557276 (Lighthouse, Poole, 6–7 March 2003)
Botstein—American Symphony Orchestra. ASO download 091 (Avery Fisher Hall, 7 April 2006)
Davis-C—London Symphony Orchestra (+ music by many others). LSO Live 0766 (Barbican Hall, 24 September 2008)
Oundjian—Toronto Symphony Orchestra (+ Symphony No. 5). TSO Live 0311 (Thomson Hall, March 2011)
Kalmar—Oregon Symphony Orchestra (+ music by Ives + Adams + Britten). PentaTone PTC 5186 393 (Schnitzer Hall, Portland, 7–8 May 2011)
Wigglesworth—London Philharmonic Orchestra (+ Jurowski's recording of Symphony No. 8). LPO CD 0082 (Royal Festival Hall, 1 May 2013)
Spano—Atlanta Symphony Orchestra (+ Cantata "Dona nobis pacem" + The Lark Ascending). ASO Media CD-1005 (Woodruff Center, Atlanta, 21–22 February 2014)
Elder—Hallé Orchestra (+ Symphony No. 6). Hallé CD HLL 7547 (Bridgewater Hall, Manchester, 7 April 2016)
Manze—Royal Liverpool Philharmonic Orchestra (+ A Pastoral Symphony). Onyx 4161 (Philharmonic Hall, Liverpool, 5–7 May 2016)
Pappano—London Symphony Orchestra (+ Symphony No. 6). LSO Live LSO0867D (Barbican Hall, London, 15 March 2020)

References

Further reading
 
Brown, Geoff (June 2001). "The Times, The Times, and the Fourth Symphony." Journal of the RVW Society, no. 21, pp. 29–31.
Gray, Laura (2000). "'I don’t know whether I like it, but it’s what I meant': Generic Designation and Issues of Modernism in Vaughan Williams' Symphony No. 4 in F minor." Studies in Music from the University of Western Ontario, nos. 19–20, pp. 181–97.
Harper-Scott, J.P.E. (2010). "Vaughan Williams’s Antic Symphony." In Matthew Riley, ed., British Music and Modernism, 1895–1960 (Ashgate), pp. 147–174.
Long, N. Gerrard (June 1947). "Vaughan Williams's Fourth Symphony: A Study in Interpretation." The Monthly Musical Record, vol. 77, no. 887, pp. 116–121. 
Ottaway, D. Hugh (November 1950). "Vaughan Williams's Symphony in F Minor." Hallé, no. 30, pp. 11–13. 
Ross, Ryan (2019). "'Blaspheming Beethoven?': The Altered BACH Motive in Vaughan Williams’s Fourth Symphony." Acta Musicologica, vol. 91, no. 2, pp. 126–145.

External links
 

1935 compositions
Symphony 004
Compositions in F minor